The Polish National Road Race Championships are held annually to decide the Polish cycling champions in the road race discipline, across various categories.

Men

Amateur

Elite

Under 23

Women

Senior

References

External links
cyclingwebsite.net

National road cycling championships
Cycle races in Poland
Recurring sporting events established in 1919
National championships in Poland
1919 establishments in Poland